Jan "Jacky" Willem Hurter Morkel (13 November 1890 – 15 May 1916) was a South African international rugby union player, who also played first class cricket. Morkel played at centre for Somerset West RFC and Western Province. He played in 18 games on the tour, including all five test matches, and scored four tries, two of them against . His brother, Gerhard, and his cousins 'Boy' and Dougie, were also on the tour. Jacky Morkel also represented Transvaal in cricket.

In the First World War, Morkel served as a scout in the 1st South African Mounted Brigade in German East Africa. When his unit was effectively cut off by the onset of the rainy season in April 1916, he and many of his fellow soldiers became sick. He died of dysentery, and is buried in the Dar es Salaam War Cemetery in modern-day Tanzania near Tommy Thompson, who was also on the 1912–1913 tour.

His entry on the International Roll of Honour reads:

Early life
Morkel was born on 13 November 1890 in Somerset West, in what is today the Western Cape, South Africa.

Rugby career

Morkel, who was a 'very quiet, unassuming fellow, a man of few words', was one of 21 brothers and cousins who played first class rugby in South Africa before the First World War, eight of whom played for the Springboks. Morkel played rugby for Somerset West Rugby Club, and from 1911 to 1914, for Western Province. Alongside Morkel in the team were his brother Gerhard, at full-back, and his cousins 'Boy' and Dougie, in the forwards.

The team played 27 matches, winning every game except those against Newport, Swansea and a combined London XV. In the game against Llanelli, he kicked the ball over the three-quarters, caught it, then repeated the move against the full-back, and scored under the posts to take the game for South Africa by one point. Jacky and his cousin Dougie scored all the points in the victory over England.

Billy Geen and Fred Perrett, who were also killed in the First World War, were part of the  team that narrowly lost to the South African tourists in December 1912. Amongst the Springboks, as well as Jacky Morkel, both Sep Ledger and Tommy Thompson were also killed in action.

International appearances

Military service
In the First World War, Morkel served as a scout with the 1st South African Mounted Brigade, under the command of Brigadier-General Jacob van Deventer in German East Africa. When Jan Smuts took command of the British Forces in East Africa on 12 February 1916, Morkel's brigade was with the 1st Division at Longido, following the unsuccessful assault on the German position at Salaita Hill. The brigade was transferred to Mbuyuni, arriving 4 March, where the 2nd Division was positioned, to act under the direct orders of Smuts, in the forthcoming move to occupy the Kilimanjaro area, before the rains arrived. The objective was rapidly achieved by 21 March, the 1st Mounted Brigade having played a critical role.

Smuts then reorganised his forces into three divisions: the First, under Major-General Hoskins; the Second, including the 1st South African Mounted Brigade at Aruscha, under van Deventer, recently promoted Major-General; and the Third, under Major-General Coen Brits. At the start of April, the forces under van Deventer began to advance southwards, the 1st Mounted Brigade taking Ufiome on 13 April, and pursuing the enemy until they reached Ssalanga on 17 April, where they paused to rest. By this time, the rainy season had set in, and van Deventer's division was cut off, and unable to progress beyond Kondoa Irangi. The troops lived off such local supplies as could be obtained, and their health severely deteriorated. The Germans, under direct command of Colonel von Lettow, the German Commander-in-Chief, took advantage of the situation to attack the 2nd Division at Kondoa Irangi, commencing on 7 May and continuing until 10 May, when they withdrew. Meanwhile, van Deventer was unable to counter due to the loss of horses from disease, and the sickness of his troops.

Morkel himself contracted dysentery and died on 15 May 1916. He is buried in Dar es Salaam War Cemetery (Grave 5. K. 6.) in Tanzania, near his friend and team-mate Tommy Thompson, who was shot dead soon after.

See also
 List of international rugby union players killed in action during the First World War
 List of cricketers who were killed during military service

References

Bibliography

Further reading

External links
 
 Cricinfo: Jan Morkel

1890 births
1916 deaths
People from Somerset West
White South African people
Rugby union centres
South African rugby union players
South Africa international rugby union players
South African cricketers
Gauteng cricketers
South African military personnel killed in World War I
South African military personnel of World War I
Deaths from dysentery
Rugby union players from the Western Cape
Western Province (rugby union) players